Transtel may refer to:
 Transtel, a former company and a label used by German public broadcasters as an international distributor of TV programs, now part of Deutsche Welle
 Transtel, a former operating division of Transnet in South Africa. Transtel merged to become Neotel, which is now part of Liquid Telecom Group.
 Transtel Togo, the original name for Air Horizon, an African airline